Jacques Vosloo (born 26 September 2001) is a South African cricketer. He made his Twenty20 debut for Mpumalanga in the 2018 Africa T20 Cup on 14 September 2018.

References

External links
 

2001 births
Living people
South African cricketers
Mpumalanga cricketers
Place of birth missing (living people)